Lasiantheae is a tribe of flowering plants in the family Rubiaceae and contains 239 species in 3 genera. Its representatives are found in Central America, the Caribbean, tropical Africa, and tropical and subtropical Asia.

Genera 
Currently accepted names
 Lasianthus Jack (203 sp) - distribution of the tribe
 Saldinia A.Rich. ex DC. (22 sp) - Comoros, Madagascar
 Trichostachys Hook.f. (14 sp) - West and West-Central tropical Africa

Synonyms
 Dasus Lour. = Lasianthus
 Dressleriopsis Dwyer = Lasianthus
 Litosanthes Blume = Lasianthus
 Mephitidia Reinw. ex Blume = Lasianthus
 Octavia DC. = Lasianthus
 Santia Wight & Arn. = Lasianthus

References 

Rubioideae tribes